Megan Bonnell is a Canadian folk musician.

Early life 
Bonnell was born in Caledon, Ontario Between the ages of four and twelve, she taught herself to play piano by ear. Bonnell attended Mayfield Secondary School, where she studied voice. She performed her first gig as part of "Caledon Idol" at the Caledon Inn. In her late teens, Bonnell moved to Toronto. She later pursued a degree in English and political science at the University of Toronto.

Career 
Before graduating high school, Bonnel formed the indie-pop band, Reily, with friends. While in university, Bonnel toured Canada with the band.

Bonnell's first full-length solo album, Hunt and Chase, was released by Toronto's Nevado Records in 2013. It was produced by Chris Stringer and Joshua Van Tassel, whom Bonnell met while working as a barista at Ella's Uncle Café in Toronto. She released Magnolia on April 15, 2016, with Cadence Music. In 2016, she toured Canada as a supporting act for the Great Lake Swimmers. She toured with them again in 2018. Bonnell's third album, Separate Rooms, was released on April 6, 2018. The lead single and title track of Separate Rooms, which was co-written with Donovan Wood, reached number one on the CBC Music Top 20. The single "Your Voice" reached number 4 on the list. As part of the 2019 Juno Awards' Juno's 365, Bonnell covered Blue Rodeo's "Try".

Discography 

 Maps (EP)
 Hunt and Chase (2013)
 Magnolia (2016)
 Separate Rooms (2018)

Awards and nominations

References 

Canadian folk musicians
Musicians from Ontario
People from Caledon, Ontario
University of Toronto alumni
Canadian folk singer-songwriters
Canadian women singer-songwriters
21st-century Canadian women singers
Canadian women folk guitarists
Canadian women pianists
Living people
Date of birth missing (living people)
21st-century women pianists
Year of birth missing (living people)